Ponnan Rahul (born 4 February 1992) is an Indian cricketer who represents Kerala in domestic cricket. He is a left-handed top order batsman and occasional right-arm off-spinner.

Domestic career
After representing Kerala in U-22 and U-25 levels, Rahul made his first-class debut for Kerala in the 2017–18 Ranji Trophy on 6 October 2017 against Jharkhand. He played 6 matches in the 2018–19 Ranji Trophy, scoring 370 runs and finished the tournament as Kerala's fourth highest run-scorer. He also scored his maiden first-class century in the season. However, he scored just 137 runs from five matches in the next Ranji season with a highest score of 97.

He made his List A debut on 29 September 2019, for Kerala in the 2019–20 Vijay Hazare Trophy against Hyderabad. He made his Twenty20 debut on 8 November 2019, for Kerala in the 2019–20 Syed Mushtaq Ali Trophy against Tamil Nadu.

Rahul made a career-best score of 147 against Meghalaya in the 2021-22 Ranji Trophy.

Personal life
Rahul narrowly survived a motorcycle crash in 2017.

References

External links
 

1992 births
Living people
Indian cricketers
People from Alappuzha
Kerala cricketers